N. nitida may refer to:
 Neomacounia nitida, the Macoun's shining moss, an extinct moss species that was found only in a small area of Ontario
 Nitidella nitida, the glossy dove shell, a sea snail species found in the Red Sea and in the Gulf of Mexico, the Caribbean Sea and the Lesser Antilles, and from Florida to Brazil
 Nothofagus nitida, the Coigüe de Chiloé in Spanish, an evergreen tree species native from Chile and probably Argentina

See also 
 Nitida (disambiguation)